Luogang Subdistrict is a subdistrict of China in Baohe District, Hefei, Anhui, China. , it administers the following ten residential neighborhoods and two villages: 
Luogang
Guantang
Shihe
Gaowang
Luji
Baoheyuan
Baohehuayuan
Chegu
Shiqiao Community
Fanhua Community
Luda Village
Beidou Village

See also 
 List of township-level divisions of Anhui

References 

Township-level divisions of Anhui
Hefei